Radionuclides which emit gamma radiation are valuable in a range of different industrial, scientific and medical technologies. This article lists some common gamma-emitting radionuclides of technological importance, and their properties.

Fission products 

Many artificial radionuclides of technological importance are produced as fission products within nuclear reactors. A fission product is a nucleus with approximately half the mass of a uranium or plutonium nucleus which is left over after such a nucleus has been "split" in a nuclear fission reaction.

Caesium-137 is one such radionuclide. It has a half-life of 30 years, and decays by beta decay without gamma ray emission to a metastable state of barium-137. Barium-137m has a half-life of a 2.6 minutes and is responsible for all of the gamma ray emission in this decay sequence. The ground state of barium-137 is stable.

These gamma rays can be used, for example, in radiotherapy such as for the treatment of cancer, in food irradiation, or in industrial gauges or sensors.  is not widely used for industrial radiography as other nuclides, such as cobalt-60 or iridium-192, offer higher radiation output for a given volume.

Iodine-131 is another important gamma-emitting radionuclide produced as a fission product. With a short half-life of 8 days, this radioisotope is not of practical use in radioactive sources in industrial radiography or sensing. However, since iodine is a component of biological molecules such as thyroid hormones, iodine-131 is of great importance in nuclear medicine, and in medical and biological research as a radioactive tracer.

Lanthanum-140 is a decay product of barium-140, a common fission product. It is a potent gamma emitter. It was used in high quantities during the Manhattan Project for the RaLa Experiments.

Activation products 

Some radionuclides, such as cobalt-60 and iridium-192, are made by the neutron irradiation of normal non-radioactive cobalt and iridium metal in a nuclear reactor, creating radioactive nuclides of these elements which contain extra neutrons, compared to the original stable nuclides.

In addition to their uses in radiography, both cobalt-60 and iridium-192 are used in the radiotherapy of cancer. Cobalt-60 tends to be used in teletherapy units as a higher photon energy alternative to caesium-137, while iridium-192 tends to be used in a different mode of therapy, internal radiotherapy or brachytherapy.  The iridium wires for brachytherapy are a palladium-coated iridium/palladium alloy wire made radioactive by neutron activation. This wire is then inserted into a tumor such as a breast tumor, and the tumor is irradiated by gamma ray photons from the wire. At the end of the treatment the wire is removed.

A rare but notable gamma source is sodium-24; this has a fairly short half-life of 15 hours, but it emits photons with very high energies (>2 MeV). It could be used for radiography of thick steel objects if the radiography occurred close to the point of production.

Minor actinides 

Americium-241 has been used as a source of low energy gamma photons, it has been used in some applications such as portable X-ray fluorescence equipment (XRF) and common household ionizing smoke detectors.

Natural radioisotopes 

Many years ago radium-226 and radon-222 were used as gamma-ray sources for industrial radiography: for instance, a radon-222 source was used to examine the mechanisms inside an unexploded V-1 flying bomb, while some of the early Bathyspheres could be examined using radium-226 to check for cracks. Because both radium and radon are very radiotoxic and very expensive due to their natural rarity, these natural radioisotopes have fallen out of use over the last half-century, replaced by artificially created radioisotopes. Radon therapy sits on the edge of radioactive quackery and genuine radiotherapy in part due to the lack of reliable data on the stated health benefits.

Table of some useful gamma emitting isotopes

Note only half lives between 100 min and 5,000 yr are listed as short half-lives are usually not practical to use, and long half-lives usually mean extremely low specific activity. d= day, hr = hour, yr = year.

See also
 Isotopes of caesium
 Common beta emitters
 http://www.iem-inc.com/information/tools/radiation-energies/gamma-emitters
 useful radioisotope search tool

References

Nuclear physics
Nuclear chemistry
Radioactivity
Isotopes
Nuclear materials
Gamma rays